Vedruka is a village in Paide (urban municipality), Järva County, in northern-central Estonia. Prior to the 2017 administrative reform in Estonia of local governments, it was located in Roosna-Alliku Parish.

References

 

Villages in Järva County